Behavioural Pharmacology is a peer-reviewed scientific journal covering the effects of biological active compounds on behaviour in animals, including humans. It is published by Lippincott Williams & Wilkins and the current editor-in-chief is professor Louk Vanderschuren (Utrecht University).

Abstracting and indexing 
The journal is abstracted and indexed in:

According to the Journal Citation Reports, the journal has a 2014 impact factor of 2.148.

References

External links 
 

Lippincott Williams & Wilkins academic journals
English-language journals
Publications established in 1989
Pharmacology journals
Neuroscience journals